The Matador was a bar in Portland, Oregon, United States.

Description and history
The dive bar was established in 1971. It closed on September 12, 2014, after operating for more than forty years.

See also
 List of dive bars

References

1971 establishments in Oregon
2014 disestablishments in Oregon
Defunct drinking establishments in Oregon
Defunct restaurants in Portland, Oregon
Dive bars in Portland, Oregon
Defunct dive bars